James Elbert "Jake" McNiece (May 24, 1919 – January 21, 2013) was a US Army paratrooper in World War II. Sergeant McNiece was a member of the Filthy Thirteen, an elite demolition unit whose exploits inspired the 1965 novel and 1967 film The Dirty Dozen.

Early life
James McNiece was born on May 24, 1919, in Maysville, Oklahoma, the ninth of ten children born to Eli Hugh and Rebecca (née Ring) McNiece, and of Irish American and Choctaw descent. During the Depression, the  family moved to Ponca City, Oklahoma in 1931. In 1939, he graduated from Ponca City High School and went to work in road construction, and then at the Pine Bluff Arsenal, where he gained experience in the use of explosives.

Military career
McNiece enlisted for military service on September 1, 1942. He was assigned to the demolition saboteur section of what was then the 506th Parachute Infantry Regiment. This section became the Filthy Thirteen, first led by Lieutenant Charles Mellen, who was killed in action on June 6, 1944, during the Invasion of Normandy. Following Mellen's death, Sergeant McNiece led the unit.

McNiece's demolitions experience with the fire department before the war made him the section sergeant and his mission focus kept him in that rank in spite of his deliberate disobedience and disrespect during training. His first sergeant and company commanders knew he was the man the regiment could count on during combat. His escapades are documented in his words in The Filthy Thirteen, Fighting With the Filthy Thirteen, and War Paint; The Filthy Thirteen Jump Into Normandy.

McNiece went on to make a total of four wartime combat jumps, the first as part of the Invasion of Normandy in 1944. In the same year he jumped as part of Operation Market Garden in the Netherlands, which was featured in the book (and subsequent film), A Bridge Too Far, and at the Siege of Bastogne, part of the larger Battle of the Bulge. During fighting in the Netherlands, he was promoted to demolition platoon sergeant. He volunteered for pathfinder training, anticipating he would sit out the rest of the war training in England, but his pathfinder stick was called upon to jump into Bastogne to guide in resupply drops. His last jump was in 1945, near Prüm in Germany. In recognition of his natural leadership abilities, he ended the war as the acting first sergeant for Headquarters Company, 506th Parachute Infantry Regiment. He was discharged from the military in February 1946.

After World War II
In 1949, McNiece returned to live in Ponca City. He began a 28-year career with the United States Postal Service. His first wife Rosita died in 1952 and, a year later, he married Martha Beam Wonders. They had two sons and a daughter and remained married until his death.

Last years
In 1997, historian Richard E. Killblane, also from Ponca City, began recording Jake's oral history of his escapades during the war and wrote The Filthy Thirteen, which Casemate Publishers published in 2003. This made Jake an instant celebrity among World War II airborne fans and he toured the United States and Europe educating and entertaining younger generations with his accounts of the war. In 2012, McNiece was awarded the French Legion of Honour Chevalier class. He died on January 21, 2013, at the age of 93.

Military Awards
Combat Infantryman Badge
Parachutist Badge with four combat jump stars
Pathfinder Badge
Bronze Star Medal with Combat "V" and three oak leaf clusters
Purple Heart with oak leaf cluster
Good Conduct Medal
American Campaign Medal
European-African-Middle Eastern Campaign Medal with arrowhead device and four campaign stars
World War II Victory Medal
Army of Occupation Medal with "Germany" clasp
Chevalier of the Legion of Honor (France)
Five Overseas service bars

Other honors
McNiece was an inductee in the Oklahoma Military Hall of Fame, and an honorary colonel of the 95th Victory Division. He was the  recipient of an honorary master's degree in Military Science from Cumberland University in Lebanon, Tennessee. He had participated in military maneuvers there in 1943. In 2010, an action figure of McNiece, the last surviving member of the Filthy Thirteen, was released. In 2017, he was among the first class inducted into the Ponca City High School Hall of Fame.

See also
101st Airborne Division
506th Infantry Regiment

References

Bibliography

External links

Jake McNiece at libertyjumpteam.org
Jake McNiece at usairborne.be

1919 births
2013 deaths
United States Army personnel of World War II
American people of Choctaw descent
Chevaliers of the Légion d'honneur
People from Maysville, Oklahoma
People from Ponca City, Oklahoma
People from Sangamon County, Illinois
Ponca City High School alumni
United States Army soldiers
United States Postal Service people